House of Truth may refer to:

 Congregation Beth Emeth (House of Truth), a Jewish synagogue in New York
 House of Truth (song), 2019 song by Jamie Hannah and Boy George
 House of Truth (Washington, D.C.), an early 20th century political salon in the United States
 The Ghost and the House of Truth, 2019 film by Akin Omotoso
 The House of Truth (professional wrestling), an American professional wrestling stable